Fábrica Nacional de Relógios, Reguladora, S. A. or simply Reguladora is a watch and clock manufacturing company, based in Vila Nova de Famalicão, Portugal. Founded in 1892, Reguladora is the oldest watch manufacturing company in the Iberian Peninsula.

Reguladora produces four ranges of watches: column clocks, table clocks, wall clocks and wristwatches (including pocket watches).

History
Reguladora was founded in 1892 in Famalicão, by José Gomes Carvalho. 

Beginning production with mechanical wall and table clocks, Reguladora expanded its range of products in the 1950s, with column clocks and alarm clocks.

After having been closed, the company was purchased by its employees, returning to production. 

Presently, Reguladora produces electronic watches and clocks, both for domestic and industrial application.

Products
Reguladora produces the following products:
 Column clock models: Atenas, Camberra, Monaco and Santa Comba.
 Table clock models: Batalha, Batalha Flores, Batalha Romano, Évora, Fátima, Floral, Funchal, Leiria, Mini Batalha Mecânico, Polo, Mini Batalha, Mini Sintra, Tomar, Viena Romano and Vigo.
 Wall clock models: BR6, Bragança, Cascais, Cavalinho, Coimbra, COP326, COP327, COP328, COP329, COP330, Corunha, CP26, Douro Carrilhão, Estoril, Gótico, Madrid Árabe, Madrid Romano, Mindelo, Óbidos, Oito, Olso Árabe, Oslo Romano, Paris, QR3355 and QR3356.
 Wristwatch models: Turbilhão 8C2022, 4422CH, 8C2031, 4415, 8C2048, 8C2023A, 8C2040, 8C2041, 8C2021, 8C2140, 8C2043, 8C2039, 8C301B, 8C224, 8C186 Preto, 8C186 Branco, 8C242, 91916, 8C243, 90216 and T01482 (pocket watch).

References

Watch brands
Watch manufacturing companies
Manufacturing companies established in 1892
Manufacturing companies of Portugal
Portuguese brands
1892 establishments in Portugal